Donald Theodore Cochrane (October 23, 1906 – May 10, 1969) was a Canadian politician. He served in the Legislative Assembly of New Brunswick as member of the Liberal party from 1944 to 1952.

References

1906 births
1969 deaths
New Brunswick Liberal Association MLAs